In linguistics, a suprafix is a type of affix that gives a suprasegmental pattern (such as tone, stress, or nasalization) to either a neutral base or a base with a preexisting suprasegmental pattern. This affix will, then, convey a derivational or inflectional meaning. This suprasegmental pattern acts like segmental phonemes within a morpheme; the suprafix is a combination of suprasegmental phonemes, organized into a pattern, that creates a morpheme. For example, a number of African languages express tenseaspect distinctions by tone. English has a process of changing stress on verbs to create nouns.

History
Driven by structural linguists in the United States, the suprafix was more frequently used by such linguists during the time of American structuralism. The idea of suprasegmental morphemes was introduced in Eugene Nida's morphology textbook, where he suggested the term, suprafix, to account for these kinds of morphemes; the term was adopted by George L. Trager and Henry Lee Smith Jr. in their paper on the structure of English. It was further described in Edith Trager's article on the suprafix in English verbal compounds and in Archibald A. Hill's introductory linguistics of English text.  Later, it was taken up in Peter Matthews' influential morphology textbook.

Some linguists prefer superfix, which was introduced by George L. Trager for the stress pattern of a word, which he regarded as a special morpheme that combines and unifies the parts of a word. Another term that has not been widely adopted, but has been suggested to replace suprafix or superfix, is simulfix. This word has been offered as a replacement term because many linguists have noted that the addition of suprasegmental phonemes is added neither above nor below the segmental phonemes; instead it is affixed altogether. However, a simulfix has been used to describe different morphological phenomena and, therefore, has not been adopted for the purposes defined here.

Types
There are two different types of suprafixes, additive and replacive. Suprafixes are additive if they add a suprasegmental pattern to the base form while replacive suprafixes simply change the pattern from the base form to a new pattern that conveys a different meaning.

Additive suprafixes
These kind of suprafixes are affixes that add suprasegmental phonemes to the base. These processes occur as a result of an underlying pattern of stress, tones, or even nasalization being added to an underlying morpheme composed of only segmental phonemes. In other words, this affix is attached to a bare base that has no other suprasegmental pattern underlyingly. This can fall under a broader category of additive morphology (e.g. processes of prefixation, suffixation, infixation, etc.). This is exemplified by a language in the Democratic Republic of the Congo, Ngbaka: wà, wā, wǎ and wá all mean 'clean'. Nida, however, explains that while the segmental base contains the meaning 'to clean', the different tones associated with the base reveal different tense/aspect information.

Replacive suprafixes
These kinds of suprafixes are affixes that replace suprasegmental phonemes of the base form. These processes occur as a result of an underlying pattern of stress, tones, or nasalization replacing a previous pattern of suprasegmental phonemes. More succinctly, this process involves stripping one suprasegmental pattern for another in order to convey a different meaning. This can fall under a broader category of replacive morphology. In this kind of morphology, some particular phoneme or phonemes are being replaced by another to attribute a different meaning. An example of this can be found in another language from the Congo, Mongbandi: ngbò and ngbó both mean 'swam'. However, Nida explains that the first word is the base form while the second exhibits the verb in second plural person. Since the second plural person suprafix replaces the tonal pattern of the base form, this is a replacive suprafix.

In specific languages

In English 
The suprafix can also be defined as an underlying suprasegmental pattern that indicates a property of a particular type of phrase in a language, but especially for English. These patterns, in English, are most notable between an individually uttered word and that same word within a larger phrase. Consider, for example, the word 'house', which has no internal stress pattern, alone. However, when within a phrase like the white house (e.g. /ðə ʍàɪt hâʊs/) versus the White House (e.g. /ðə ʍáɪt hàʊs/), the stress on 'house', as the single word, changes.

English also uses a process of replacive suprafixes, where base form verbs are changed to nouns by a replacement in stress pattern, alone. Examples of this can be seen with: 'import (n) vs. im'port (v) and 'insult (n) vs. in'sult (v). Here, the stress pattern alters in order to signal the difference between noun and verb.

In other languages 
In the Ma'ya language of Indonesia, there is a toneme that marks a replacive morpheme that is also described as a suprafix. Lex van der Leeden describes the language as having a toneme pattern, such as a class 12 toneme pattern of the language, being replaced by a class 21 toneme pattern. He notes that these are inflectional changes.

In the Waurá language, there is a nasalization suprafix, which arises when the word is placed in a possessive construction. Consider nu-mapã́, 'my honey' versus mápa, 'honey'.

In Ngbaka, there are examples of additive suprafixes. The segmental string that constitutes the morpheme meaning 'to return' is kpolo. However, when the four different additive suprafixes are affixed, a change in tense/aspect is realized: kpòlò, kpōlō, kpòló and kpóló.

See also 
 Initial-stress-derived noun
 Conversion
 Simulfix

References 

Affixes